The Mighty Sound of the South is the marching band that represents and performs for the University of Memphis in Memphis, TN.  

The band plays at Memphis Tigers football games as a marching band and at Tigers basketball games as a pep band.

History 
At the end of the 1962-1963 basketball season, the Tiger team had the distinction of being the only southern team to be invited to play in the National Invitational Tournament in Madison Square Garden.  Thomas C. Ferguson, in only his second year as band director, was a big basketball fan, and furnished a pep band for every home game, which was not a given as it is today.  He decided that his pep band should go to New York City, and he called the tournament committee for permission.  They had to check into it, because a pep band had never before played for a basketball game in the Garden.  They were given the green light to become the first.

Nineteen pep band members boarded a bus for New York City.  They were determined to make a name for themselves - literally.  Using markers and an old bed sheet, they fashioned a makeshift sign with the words "The Mighty Sound of the South" to humorously describe their modestly sized band.  The basketball team went on to an impressive showing, and the name "The Mighty Sound of the South" is still used, in a more literal sense, for the 200+ member marching band.

A history of previous-thru-current directors / assistant directors of The Mighty Sound of The South is as follows:

The Mighty Sound of the South is officially charged with preserving the traditions of the Memphis Tigers and for performing “Go! Tigers! Go!” the University of Memphis Tigers’ fight song. The fight song was written by Tom Ferguson, former Director of Bands at Memphis State University during the 1960-1970s.

References

External links 
Mighty Sound of the South website
University of Memphis website

University of Memphis
American Athletic Conference marching bands
Musical groups established in 1940
1940 establishments in Tennessee